Danny Woodburn (born July 26, 1964) is an American actor, comedian, and activist for the disability rights movement linked to his dwarfism.

He played Mickey Abbott on the sitcom Seinfeld.  He has more than 150 television and 30 film appearances to date.

Early life and education
Woodburn  is a graduate of Abington Senior High School in Abington Township, Montgomery County, Pennsylvania and Temple University School of Communications and Theater.  He received the school's Outstanding Alumni Achievement Award in 2001.

Career

Stage
Woodburn appeared in numerous stage productions before moving to Los Angeles, such as The Indian Wants the Bronx (by Israel Horovitz); Scapino; David Mamet's Revenge of the Space Pandas; and a touring company production of Viet Rock.  His debut in the New York theater world began with The Soda Jerk.

Stand-up comedy
A stand-up comedian for over 20 years, Woodburn has performed nationwide. He has headlined at comedy clubs which include "The Improv;" The "Comedy Store;" "Gotham Comedy Club;" "Carolines on Broadway; " The Ice House;" and the "Laugh Factory."

Television actor
Woodburn starred as "Professor Pixel" in Fox's 1992 Halloween special, Count DeClues' Mystery Castle, which was shot at The Magic Castle nightclub in Los Angeles.

Of his more than 150 TV appearances, Woodburn had numerous starring and reoccurring roles on widely recognized network shows, beginning with his memorable turns as Mickey Abbott on the multi-Emmy winning series Seinfeld. He starred on the 1997 series Conan the Adventurer (as Otli, Conan's sidekick);  Special Unit 2 as Carl; and multiple return appearances on Passions; The Bold and the Beautiful; Tracey Takes On...; Baywatch; Early Edition, Murder She Wrote; Charmed; Becker; Bones;. Additionally there were numerous guest starring roles on such shows Hunter; Lois and Clark: The New Adventures of Superman; The Pretender; Angel; CSI; Veronica's Closet; 8 Simple Rules; Monk; and Jane the Virgin.

He has guest starred on such children's television shows as The Suite Life of Zack & Cody; iCarly; Cory in the House; Nicky, Ricky, Dicky & Dawn;, and Bizaardvark.  He appeared regularly as Mr. Poulos on Crash & Bernstein.

In "Pixtopia", an episode of Disney Channel's Star vs. the Forces of Evil starring Eden Sher, he guest-voiced the pixie task master.

Film roles
Woodburn has appeared in the films Jingle All the Way; Things You Can Tell Just by Looking at Her; The Flintstones in Viva Rock Vegas; Death to Smoochy; Employee of the Month; Watchmen; Mirror Mirror; and The Identical.  He also appeared in the children's feature series Santa Buddies, The Search for Santa Paws, and Santa Paws 2: The Santa Pups.
He performed the motion capture for Splinter in Teenage Mutant Ninja Turtles, with the voice of Splinter being supplied by Tony Shalhoub.

Filmography

Film

Television

Commercial work
Woodburn was featured in a series of ads for Burger King's BK Stacker sandwiches.

Advocacy
Woodburn is an advocate for disabled and little people issues. He serves on the Screen Actors Guild "Performers with Disabilities Committee."  Throughout his career as both a comic and an actor he chose to avoid the stereotyping of little people as sight gags or props.  Gaining the respect of his peers has allowed him to actively pursue change within his profession for all disabled performers.  He has been recognized for the change of attitudes and societal perceptions of not only people with dwarfism but of all disabled persons.  He was awarded the DREAM Award by the Disability Rights Legal Center in 2009 for those efforts in TV and Film as well as the 2010 Screen Actors Guild Harold Russell Award. He was keynote speaker at 2010 RespectABILITY Conference and the Inclusion Network of Cincinnati, and has been active as both teacher and speaker for The Little People's Research Fund, Actors For Autism, Media Access, American Association of People with Disabilities (AAPD) and the National ReelAbilities Film Festivals.  He discussed some of his experiences as a little person, both on- and offscreen, in an interview with ABILITY Magazine in 2015.

Personal life
Woodburn is married to Amy Buchwald, an actress, writer, and comedian. She appeared in an episode of Conan the Adventurer as Woodburn's character's love interest.

References

External links
 
 
 
 Philly Magazine Exit Interview
 Official YouTube Channel

Living people
20th-century American comedians
20th-century American male actors
21st-century American comedians
21st-century American male actors
Male actors from Philadelphia
Temple University alumni
Actors with dwarfism
American male comedians
American male film actors
American male television actors
American male voice actors
American sketch comedians
American stand-up comedians
Comedians from Pennsylvania
1964 births